Gusztáv Vándory (6 December 1882 – 16 November 1964) was a Hungarian stage and film actor. He was born and died in Budapest.

Selected filmography
 Lili (1918)
 Yamata (1919)
 Neither at Home or Abroad (1919)
 Veszélyben a pokol (1921)
 Hyppolit, the Butler (1931)
 Spring Shower (1932)
 Flying Gold (1932)
 The Old Scoundrel (1932)
 An Auto and No Money (1932)
 The Dream Car (1934)
 Hotel Kikelet (1937)
 Modern Girls (1937)
 Sportszerelem (1938)
 Azurexpress (1938)
 The Lady Is a Bit Cracked (1938)
 The Hen-Pecked Husband (1938)
 The Five-Forty (1939)
 Duel for Nothing (1940)

Bibliography
 Kulik, Karol. Alexander Korda: The Man Who Could Work Miracles. Virgin Books, 1990.
 Schildgen, Rachel A. More Than A Dream: Rediscovering the Life and Films of Vilma Banky. 1921 PVG Publishing, 2010.

External links

1882 births
1964 deaths
Hungarian male film actors
Hungarian male silent film actors
20th-century Hungarian male actors
Hungarian male stage actors
Male actors from Budapest